The white-headed vulture (Trigonoceps occipitalis) is an Old World vulture endemic to Africa. Populations have been declining steeply in recent years due to habitat degradation and poisoning of vultures at carcasses. An extinct relative was also present in the Indonesian island of Flores during the Late Pleistocene, indicating that the genus was more widespread in the past.

Description
This species is unique among African vultures as it shows a degree of reversed sexual dimorphism, where females are somewhat larger than males.

It has a pink beak and a white crest, and the featherless areas on its head are pale. It has dark brown upper parts and black tail feathers. The feathers on its lower parts and legs are white, giving it its diagnostic image from below. These vultures are easily distinguishable from all other vulture species as the plumage exhibits a strong contrast between black and white. Individual white-headed vultures can also be reliably identified based on a unique pattern in their median wing coverts.

Distribution and habitat
The white-headed vulture is widely spread throughout sub-Saharan Africa, occurring from Senegal and Gambia east to Somalia and south to South Africa and Eswatini. It is locally uncommon to common. A total population of 10,500-18,750 individuals has been estimated, but newer estimates following recent declines suggest a population of just 5,500 individuals. It is estimated that 400 protected areas contain 1893 White-headed vulture nests, with 721 nests occurring in East Africa, 548 in Central Africa, 468 in Southern Africa and 156 in West Africa. The species prefers mixed, dry woodland at low altitudes. It generally avoids human habitation  and are considered to be restricted to protected areas. For example, the Kruger National Park and neighboring conservation areas hold the largest population of the species in South Africa.

Ecology
The species is long-lived and appears to be loyal to a territory where it remains resident. It builds nests in trees (mostly acacias or baobabs). Senegalia species are also preferred, with nests occurring on the top of the canopy in low relief, flatter areas. These vultures usually lay a single egg a couple of months after the rainy season has ended and the dry season is underway. It is generally a solitary species and nests in isolated, possibly territorial pairs. From a study across 73 pairs, the average productivity of 55 breeding attempts was 0.69 chicks per pair. White headed vultures are known to exhibit a characteristic breeding behaviour. From a study in the Kruger National Park, copulation only occurred on the nest and is described as a subtle and inconspicuous process that lasts approximately 15 to 20 seconds. Preceding actual copulation the female bird stands perpendicular to and in front of the male. The "head turning" behaviour, typically observed in other Aegypiine vultures, was not observed. The sound made by the birds during copulation is unusual and best described as a very deep squeak, but longer than a grunt. The white-headed vulture is predominantly a carrion-eater; frequently flying lower than other vulture species, it is often the first species to turn up at a carcass. However, the species is probably also an active predator if the occasion arises. For example, instances of pairs preying on species such as the mongoose (Galarella sanguinea), monitor lizard (Varanus spp), tree squirrel (Paraxerus cepapi) and scrub hare (Lepus saxatilis) have been recorded. In three of these four events, cooperative behaviour between the birds was apparent, thereby suggesting that this behaviour is not uncommon. There was also no observable agonistic behaviour between birds while feeding, and the birds appeared practiced and unaffected by the presence of an observer. These observations suggest that the vulture might be regular facultative predators. However, extensive field reports are lacking therefore further research is warranted.

Additionally, the visual field of this vulture species is more similar to other predatory species such as the accipitrid hawk than to that of more closely related, carrion feeding Gyps vultures. Specifically, they have a significantly wider binocular field (30°, compared to the 20° of Gyps vultures), which is thought to help with the accurate placement and timing of the talons necessary to capture live prey.

Conservation and threats
White-headed vulture populations have been declining since the early 1940s; it was classified as Vulnerable in the 2007 IUCN Red List. Recent indications that the species is rarer than previously thought have led to a status upgrade to Critically Endangered in 2015.

The main threats to white-headed vulture populations are reductions in the availability of suitable food sources (carcasses of medium-sized mammals and ungulates) and the loss of habitat to the spread of urban and agricultural developments. Poisoning through baits set for other carnivores such as jackals and hyenas, as well as targeted poisoning of vultures (by poachers who seek to prevent vultures from drawing attention to an illegal kill), is also an important factor. Secondary causes of decline is exploitation for the international trade in raptors and use in traditional medicines. The species is highly sensitive to land-use and tends to depart from degraded habitat, leading to high concentrations in protected areas. Potential introduction of the anti-inflammatory drug Diclofenac, which is fatal to all vultures of the closely related genus Gyps when ingested at livestock carcasses, may represent a potential future threat.

On the 20th of June 2019, the carcasses of 468 white-backed vultures, 17 white-headed vultures, 28 hooded vultures, 14 lappet-faced vultures and 10 cape vultures, altogether 537 vultures, besides 2 tawny eagles, were found in northern Botswana. It is suspected that they died after eating the carcasses of 3 elephants that were poisoned by poachers, possibly to avoid detection by the birds, which help rangers to track poaching activity by circling above where there are dead animals.

References

External links

 White-headed vulture - Species text in The Atlas of Southern African Birds.
 Vulture culture on Lairweb
 Raptors of Namibia

white-headed vulture
Birds of prey of Sub-Saharan Africa
Critically endangered fauna of Africa
white-headed vulture
Taxa named by William John Burchell